Wu Lei (born 19 November 1991) is a Chinese professional footballer who plays as a forward for Chinese Super League club Shanghai Port and the China national team. He is widely regarded as one of the best Chinese footballers in history.

Wu is the all-time top goalscorer for Shanghai SIPG with 182 goals, and the second all-time top goalscorer in Chinese Super League history with 113 goals. Wu also holds the record for being the youngest player to have appeared in a Chinese professional league match aged 14 years and 287 days.

Early life
Wu was born in Nanjing and developed a passion for football at an early age. Turned down by Jiangsu Sainty's youth academy for being too small, Wu took a recommendation letter from former Chinese footballer Li Hongbing and went to Shanghai to apply for the Genbao Football Base in 2003. After watching a single training session of Wu, Xu Genbao, the founder and owner of Genbao Football Base, decided to recruit Wu. Later in 2005, Wu and his teammates joined Shanghai East Asia, which was jointly founded by Xu Genbao.

Club career

Shanghai SIPG
Wu started his football career playing for third-tier side Shanghai SIPG, making his debut for the club on 2 September 2006 in a 5–3 loss against Yunnan Lijiang Dongba, making him the youngest ever player to play professional Chinese football aged 14 years and 287 days. He helped the club win the third tier title and promotion to the second tier at the end of the 2007 league season. He scored his first goal for the club on 30 August 2008 in a 2–0 win against Qingdao Hailifeng. This made him the second youngest goalscorer in Chinese football aged 16 years and 289 days, just 47 days behind Cao Yunding's record.

On 8 March 2013, Wu scored on his Chinese Super League debut, in a 4-1 away defeat at Beijing Guoan. Wu scored a hat-trick on 2 June 2013 in a 6–1 win against Shanghai Shenxin, becoming the second youngest player to score a hat-trick in the top tier. He scored his second hat-trick of the season on 18 August 2013 in a 3–2 win against Tianjin Teda. He scored his third hat-trick of the season on 27 September 2013 in a 6–1 win against Qingdao Jonoon. On 31 July 2016, Wu became the first Chinese footballer in over two years to score a hat-trick in the Chinese Super League in a 3–3 draw against Guangzhou R&F. On 18 March 2018, he scored four goals in a 5–2 win against Guangzhou R&F, becoming the second Chinese footballer to score four goals in a league match after Li Jinyu. 

On 11 August 2018, Wu scored his 89th Chinese Super League goal in a 2-0 home win against Shanghai Shenhua, becoming the competition's record goalscorer, surpassing previous record of 88 by former Shandong Luneng striker Han Peng.  Wu won the 2018 Chinese Super League with SIPG, while he also won the Golden Boot award with 27 goals, becoming the first Chinese footballer to win the award since Li Jinyu in 2007. Wu was also named as the Chinese Football Association Footballer of the Year at the end of the season, becoming the Chinese footballer to win the award since Du Zhenyu in 2007.

RCD Espanyol
On 28 January 2019, Wu transferred to La Liga side RCD Espanyol for a reported fee of €2 million, signing a three-year contract with an option for an additional year. He made his debut for the club on 3 February 2019 in a 2–2 draw against Villarreal, coming on as a substitute for Dídac Vilà in the 77th minute. It was watched by more than 40 million people in China. He became the second Chinese footballer to play in La Liga after Zhang Chengdong. On 9 February 2019, he came on as a substitute and earned a penalty which produced the equalizer in a 2–1 win against Rayo Vallecano. On 17 February 2019, Wu became the first Chinese footballer to start a La Liga match in a 0–0 draw against Valencia CF. Wu scored his first goal for the club on 2 March 2019 in a 3–1 win against Real Valladolid, becoming the first Chinese footballer to score in La Liga. On 24 April 2019, Wu scored his second goal for the club in a 1–1 draw against Celta. On 18 May 2019, Wu scored his third goal for the club in a 2–0 win against Real Sociedad, securing Espanyol's spot in the 2019–20 UEFA Europa League qualifying stages.

On 25 July 2019, Wu made his UEFA Europa League debut in the qualifying rounds in a 4–0 win against Stjarnan, coming on as a substitute for Esteban Granero. A month later, he scored his first goal in the same competition in a 3–0 win against Luzern. His goal, a header in the third minute, was the fastest in the club's European history and was also the first goal scored by a Chinese footballer in any European continental competition since 2013. On 3 October 2019, Wu became the first Chinese footballer ever to score in European competition, excluding qualifying stages, scoring in a 2–0 win against CSKA Moscow. On 4 January 2020, Wu became the first Chinese player to score against Barcelona, scoring a 88th-minute equaliser for Espanyol after coming on as a substitute in a 2–2 draw. The club suffered relegation at the end of 2019–20 La Liga but made an immediate return in the following year after winning the 2020–21 Segunda División. On 15 August 2021, Wu made his 100th appearance for the club in a 0-0 away draw at CA Osasuna.

Return to Shanghai Port
On 11 August 2022, Wu returned to Chinese Super League club Shanghai Port. On 20 September 2022, Wu made his second debut for Shanghai Port in a 2-1 win against Henan Songshan Longmen. On 29 September 2022, he scored his first 2 goals after returning in a 3-0 win against Chengdu Rongcheng. On 24 October 2022, he scored a hat trick in a 7-0 win against Meizhou Hakka.

International career
Wu was called up to the Chinese under-20 national team in 2009 and scored nine goals in five matches during the 2010 AFC U-19 Championship qualification matches. His impressive goalscoring performances saw him called up to the Chinese national team for the 2010 East Asian Football Championship, making his debut on 14 February 2010 in a 2–0 win against Hong Kong.

Several months later, Wu returned to the under-20 national team for the 2010 AFC U-19 Championship and he played in four games and score two goals while he aided China to the quarterfinals by the end of the tournament. He scored his first goal for China on 28 July 2013 in a 4–3 win against Australia at the 2013 EAFF East Asian Cup.

On 11 January 2019, Wu scored twice in a 3-0 win against Philippines at the group stage of 2019 AFC Asian Cup. On 8 October 2021, Wu scored twice in a 3-2 win against Vietnam in the 2022 FIFA World Cup qualification, including an injury time winner.

Player profile

Style of play
Wu has been praised for his goalscoring exploits and off-the-ball movements. He is known for his explosive speed, especially on counterattacks. A versatile forward, Wu is capable of playing anywhere across the frontline. Although he has played as a striker and second striker, he often plays as a winger and can operate on either flank.

Reception
Wu's goalscoring prowess drew praise from former manager Gao Hongbo, who stated, "Wu's scoring ability is innate, making him a gifted player." In 2013, former mentor Xu Genbao, who has been attributed to helping develop Wu, described him as "China's Maradona". Wu's performances during the 2013 Copa del Sol caught the eye of Molde FK's manager Ole Gunnar Solskjær. Solskjær commented on Wu's footballing prowess, stating, "He is a good striker; if he moves to Molde, I think he can improve well enough to play for an English Premiership side in a year."

Wu's transfer from Shanghai SIPG to La Liga side Espanyol on 28 January 2019 drew widespread attention amongst Chinese media outlets. According to PPTV, the official broadcaster of La Liga in China, more than 25 million fans in China watched Espanyol win 3–1 against Real Valladolid, in which Wu scored his first goal for the club.

Personal life
Wu is of Hui ethnicity. He married his girlfriend Zhong Jiabei in 2014 and has two children, a daughter and a son.

Career statistics

Club

International

Scores and results list China's goal tally first, score column indicates score after each Wu goal.

Honours
Shanghai SIPG
Chinese Super League: 2018
China League One: 2012
China League Two: 2007

Espanyol
Segunda División: 2020–21

China PR
East Asian Football Championship: 2010

Individual
Chinese Football Association Footballer of the Year: 2018
AFC Champions League All-Star Squad: 2016, 2017
Chinese Super League Golden Boot winner: 2018
Chinese Super League Domestic Golden Boot winner: 2013, 2014, 2015, 2016, 2017, 2018
Chinese Super League Team of the Year: 2014, 2015, 2016, 2017, 2018
Chinese Footballer of the Year: 2018, 2019
AFC Asian Cup Team of the Tournament: 2019
IFFHS AFC Man Team of the Year: 2020
IFFHS AFC Men's Team of the Decade 2011–2020
IFFHS Asian Men's Team of All Time: 2021

References

External links
 Player profile at sports.online.sh.cn

1991 births
Living people
Hui sportspeople
Footballers from Jiangsu
Sportspeople from Nanjing
Chinese footballers
Association football midfielders
Shanghai Port F.C. players
RCD Espanyol footballers
China League One players
Chinese Super League players
La Liga players
Segunda División players
China youth international footballers
China international footballers
2015 AFC Asian Cup players
2019 AFC Asian Cup players
Chinese expatriate footballers
Chinese expatriate sportspeople in Spain
Expatriate footballers in Spain